In April 2015, Wizz Air Ukraine flew to the following destinations (all operations ceased in the week prior to 20 April 2015):

Europe
Germany
Cologne/Bonn - Cologne Bonn Airport
Dortmund - Dortmund Airport
Lübeck - Lübeck Airport
Memmingen - Memmingen Airport

Cyprus
Larnaca - Larnaca International Airport

Italy
Bergamo - Il Caravaggio International Airport
Naples - Naples International Airport
Venice - Treviso Airport

Poland
Katowice - Katowice International Airport

Russia
Moscow - Vnukovo International Airport

Spain
Girona - Girona–Costa Brava Airport
Valencia - Valencia Airport

Ukraine
Kyiv - Kyiv International Airport (Zhuliany) base
Lviv - Lviv Danylo Halytskyi International Airport focus city 

Georgia
Kutaisi - David the Builder Kutaisi International Airport

References

Wizz Air Ukraine